LucasVarity plc was a UK automotive parts manufacturer, created by a merger of the British Lucas Industries plc, and the North American Varity Corporation in August 1996.

History

LucasVarity traces its history back to the 1850s when Joseph Lucas, a jobless father of six, sold paraffin oil from a barrow cart around the streets of Hockley. In 1860, he founded the firm and his 17-year-old son Harry joined the firm around 1872. At first it made general pressed metal merchandise, including plant pot holders, scoops and buckets, and later in 1875 lamps for ships.  Together with the historic Canadian farm equipment maker Massey Ferguson (1891 as Massey Harris, 1847 as Newcastle Foundry and Machine Manufactory, 1870s as A. Harris Sons Co., 1920s as British based Ferguson-Brown Company) the company was formed in August 1996, by the merger between what was then called Lucas Industries plc and the North American Varity Corporation, successor to Massey Ferguson.

Foundation
At the time of the merger, Lucas employed 46,000 people compared with Varity's 9,000.  LucasVarity announced plans for a £65 million pound savings programme.  The areas streamlined included the treasury, communications and marketing departments, as well as divisional managers.  "The merger created a unique opportunity to reassess the skills and competencies we require in the senior management team", said LucasVarity Chief Executive Victor A. Rice.

Attempted relocation to the United States
In 1998, the management attempted to shift the company's head office and primary listing to the United States.  The company suffered an embarrassing defeat in a shareholder vote, amid claims that its directors were looking to cash in on the much higher pay packets available in the United States.  Victor Rice suffered a barrage of criticism from shareholders and the British media.

Sale to TRW
Following this defeat, an offer was made by TRW, an American company specializing in satellites, defence and automotive parts, to purchase the company in an all-cash offer, which was accepted in March 1999.

Subsequent history
TRW quickly sold Lucas Diesel Systems to Delphi, which was then a USA based automotive parts and systems manufacturer with a large presence in Europe, during January 2000. The diesel fuel injection equipment research, engineering and manufacturing business of Lucas, known in later years as Lucas Diesel Systems Ltd (and previously CAV Ltd) continues at all of its original worldwide sites (with the exception of those in Japan and South Carolina, USA which had closed by this time). The business name has been changed to Delphi and the business is a major part of its Powertrain Division.

Lucas Aerospace (by then called TRW Aeronautical Systems) was sold to Goodrich Corporation, which itself is now part of UTC Aerospace Systems.

TRW itself was later acquired by Northrop Grumman, who sold the automotive assets of Lucas, Varity and TRW's own automotive group to the Blackstone Group as TRW Automotive.

In September 2004 Elta Lighting Ltd., a UK-based automotive electrical components supplier, acquired a license from TRW Automotive to use the Lucas name and logo on products in the UK and Europe. This saw the familiar green and white 'Lucas' logo return to the UK after several years absence. Now trading under the name of 'Lucas Electrical' the company concentrates on after-market component supply rather than as an original equipment supplier to manufacturers. Initially the Lucas name was used on Elta's existing product of automotive light bulbs but has been gradually expanded to cover much the same range as the original Lucas company- light units, batteries, switches and controls, ignition components, remanufactured starter motors and alternators, wiper blades and electrical accessories. Operations and manufacturing take place at several locations in the UK as well as overseas.

Operations
At formation LucasVarity was managed in seven divisions.  The current ownership of these divisions is detailed below.

References

Auto parts suppliers of the United Kingdom
Defunct manufacturing companies of the United Kingdom
TRW Inc.
British companies established in 1996
British companies disestablished in 1999
Manufacturing companies established in 1996
Manufacturing companies disestablished in 1999